List of persons mentioned in the works of Tacitus is a list of people of the culture known to Tacitus who are mentioned within his writings (this list is currently incomplete).

Æmilia Lepida
Agrippina (mother to Nero) 
Annius Pollio, a small amount of detail is shown in the article : Annia gens
Antonia (sister-in-law to Tiberius) 
Apicata (first wife of Sejanus) 
Appius Silanus
Artabanus (ruler) 
Asinius Gallus
Calgacus
Caligula (emperor) 
Cartimandua (ruler) 
C.Fusius Geminus (consul) 
Claudius
Crepereius Gallus
Cornelius Sylla (consul) 
Cotta Messalinus
 Dio (p. 35) 
Drusus Caesar (second son of Germanicus) 
Fulcinius Trio (consul) 
Galba
Geminius Rufus (husband of Prisca) 
Germanicus
Helvidius Priscus (friend of Sejanus) 
Junius Blæsus (unkle to Sejanus) 
Juvenal (p. 35) 
Publius Graecinus Laco (captain of the city cohorts) 
Latinius Latiaris
L.Cassius Longinus (consul) 
Lentulus Getucilus (friend of Sejanus) 
Livia (empress) 
L.Rubellius Geminus (consul) 
Lucius Arruntius
Lucius Piso
Macro
Marcus Vinicius (consul) 
Memmius Regulus (consul) 
Nero
Nerva (lawyer) 
Obultronius Sabinus (quaestor aerarii) 
Pallas (a slave, for a while ... favourite of Claudius emperor) 
Pomponius Secundus
Poppæus Sabinus 
Prisca (wife of Geminius Rufus) 
Regulus (consul) 
Satrius Secundus
Scaurus Mamercus
Sejanus
Sexteidius Catullinus (consul) 
Thrasyllus (taught the art of prognostication) 
Tiberius
Tigranes (for a time, ruler of Armenia) 
Tiridates (ruler) 
Velleius Paterculus (historian) 
Vibulenis Agrippa
Vitellius

Sources

1st-century Romans
Tacitus